Britt Analisa McKillip (born January 18, 1991) is a Canadian actress and singer. Her credits include the film Scary Godmother: Halloween Spooktacular and its sequel Scary Godmother: The Revenge of Jimmy, and her role as Reggie Lass in the television series Dead Like Me, the film Dead Like Me: Life After Death (based on the series), and her voiceover roles as Cloe in Bratz and Princess Cadance in My Little Pony: Friendship Is Magic and Princess Harumi in Lego Ninjago: Masters of Spinjitzu.

Biography
Her father is the producer Tom McKillip, and her mother the songwriter Lynda McKillip. She has an older sister, Carly McKillip, who is also an actress. Britt performs together with Carly in the country group One More Girl. Their debut album, Big Sky, was released on October 6, 2009, in Canada. The group released a new single "The Hard Way" in 2014.

Filmography

Film

Television

References

External links 

1991 births
Living people
Actresses from Vancouver
Canadian child actresses
Canadian television actresses
Canadian film actresses
Canadian voice actresses
Canadian women country singers
Musicians from Vancouver
20th-century Canadian actresses
21st-century Canadian actresses
21st-century Canadian women singers